John Joseph Graham (born 16 July 1946) is a Scottish former professional football player and manager who played as a central midfielder and inside left. He is best remembered for the decade he spent in the Football League with Brentford, for whom he made over 400 appearances. Graham was voted into the Brentford Hall of Fame in December 2013.

Playing career

Morton 
Graham began his senior career in his native Scotland when he joined Scottish League First Division club Morton on 1 August 1964. He scored one goal in six league appearances for the club, before departing at the end of the 1965–66 season.

Dundee United 
Graham moved to fellow top-flight club Dundee United for a £15,000 fee on 20 August 1966. He failed to progress at Tannadice and made just 27 appearances over the course of three seasons, scoring 10 goals. He gained further experience on loan at United Soccer Association club Dallas Tornado during the 1967 season, for whom he scored four goals in 11 appearances. Graham departed Dundee United at the end of the 1968–69 season.

Guildford City 
Graham moved to England during the 1969 off-season to join Southern League First Division club Guildford City. He later revealed that the move was brought about because his girlfriend lived in the city. Graham scored 20 goals from the inside left position during the 1969–70 season and attracted the interest of Football League clubs. He felt he was "getting mucked about quite a bit" by Guildford, after league clubs Wolverhampton Wanderers, Oxford United, Cardiff City, Coventry City and Leeds United all pulled out of deals to sign him, due to Guildford's fee demands.

Brentford 
Graham joined Fourth Division club Brentford for a £2,500 fee in July 1970, having gone behind the back of the Guildford City board to sign for the club. He flourished under Frank Blunstone's management and moved from inside left to central midfield. He was an automatic pick in the midfield and was the team's playmaker and a regular set piece taker, scoring twice directly from corner kicks. Despite contemplating returning to Guildford City during Mike Everitt's tenure as manager, Graham remained with the Bees and made 409 appearances and scored 40 goals in his decade at Griffin Park. He tasted promotion from the Fourth Division in the 1971–72 and 1977–78 seasons and his performances garnered him the club's Players' Player of the Year award in 1971–72 and 1976–77. He was also named captain by Bill Dodgin, after having turned the role down under previous manager John Docherty.

Graham departed Brentford in 1980, after failing to see eye to eye with incoming manager Fred Callaghan. Graham received a standing ovation at Griffin Park when he emerged from the tunnel as a player with Addlestone & Weybridge Town in November 1980, prior to an FA Cup match. Graham was recognised for his service to the Bees by being awarded a testimonial versus Watford in May 1982, from which he earned approximately £3,500. Graham was inducted into the club's Hall of Fame in December 2013.

Non-League football 
Graham dropped back into non-League football to sign for Southern League Southern Division club Addlestone & Weybridge Town in 1980 and was named captain of the club. He later had spells with Farnborough Town, Hounslow Town, Woking, Burnham & Hillingdon and Staines Town.

Managerial and coaching career 
Graham had a spell managing Isthmian League First Division club Staines Town during the 1986–87 season and was named as caretaker manager for a period in 1990. He held coaching positions at Staines Town, in Millwall's Centre Of Excellence and at Combined Counties League club Cranleigh. Graham later became vice-chairman of the FA Coaches Association.

Personal life 
Graham is a Rangers supporter and was friends with Walter Smith, a former teammate at Dundee United. He worked in security for American Airlines at Heathrow Airport. Apart from a period living in a Brentford-owned house in Hounslow, Graham has lived in Guildford since 1969. After retiring from football, Graham initially worked as an engineer and as of 2005 was running a cleaning contractor business in the town. As of September 2022, at age 76, he was still running his business.

Career statistics

Honours 
Brentford
 Football League Fourth Division third-place promotion: 1971–72
 Football League Fourth Division fourth-place promotion: 1977–78

Individual

 Brentford Players' Player of the Year: 1971–72, 1976–77
 Brentford Hall of Fame

References 

1946 births
Living people
Footballers from Glasgow
Scottish footballers
Scottish Football League players
English Football League players
Greenock Morton F.C. players
Dundee United F.C. players
Guildford City F.C. players
Brentford F.C. players
Addlestone & Weybridge Town F.C. players
Farnborough F.C. players
Hounslow F.C. players
Woking F.C. players
Burnham F.C. players
Staines Town F.C. players
Staines Town F.C. managers
Southern Football League players
Isthmian League players
Isthmian League managers
Millwall F.C. non-playing staff
Expatriate soccer players in the United States
Dallas Tornado players
United Soccer Association players
Scottish expatriate footballers
Scottish expatriate sportspeople in the United States
Association football midfielders
Scottish football managers